Malacothamnus densiflorus, often known by the common names yellowstem bushmallow and yellow stem bush mallow, is a species of flowering plant in the mallow family.

Endemic range
Malacothamnus densiflorus is endemic to the Peninsular Ranges of southwestern California and northwestern Baja California. It is a member of the chaparral plant community.

Description
Malacothamnus densiflorus is a shrub with a slender, multibranched stem approaching  in maximum height. It is coated in thin to dense yellowish or tan hairs.

The thick to leathery leaves are oval in shape, a few centimeters long, and sometimes divided into lobes.

The inflorescence is a spikelike cluster of many pale pink flowers with oval or somewhat triangular petals each up to a centimeter long.

References

External links
Jepson Manual Treatment: Malacothamnus densiflorus
USDA Plants Profile: Malacothamnus densiflorus

densiflorus
Flora of California
Flora of Baja California
Natural history of the California chaparral and woodlands
Natural history of the Peninsular Ranges
Flora and fauna of the San Jacinto Mountains
Flora without expected TNC conservation status